Ne čakaj na maj (lit. Do Not Wait for May, with the English title Don't Whisper) is a 1957 Slovene romantic comedy directed by František Čap. It is a sequel to the 1953 film Vesna.

Synopsis
We meet the characters from Vesna again in this film. Vesna is on half-term holidays in the mountains, being looked after by her aunt. A meeting with Vesna's boyfriend upsets her family, and they decide that she should marry because they think she is pregnant. The confusion suits the young couple, who wanted to get married in the first place.

References

External links

1957 films
Slovene-language films
1957 romantic comedy films
Yugoslav romantic comedy films
Slovenian comedy films